"Voyageur" is a 2003 song created by the musical project, Enigma. The single was the first released from their fifth album, Voyageur. The video for the song was filmed on location in Prague, Czech Republic.

Track listing
 "Voyageur" (Radio Edit) – 3:53
 "Voyageur" (Club Mix) – 6:21
 "Voyageur" (Chillout Mix) – 4:52
 "Voyageur" (Dance Mix) – 5:29

2003 singles
2003 songs
Enigma (German band) songs
Song recordings produced by Michael Cretu
Songs written by Michael Cretu
Songs written by Jens Gad
Virgin Records singles